Tricholoma aurantio-olivaceum is a mushroom of the agaric genus Tricholoma. It was first formally described by American mycologist Alexander H. Smith in 1944.

See also
List of North American Tricholoma
List of Tricholoma species

References

aurantio-olivaceum
Fungi described in 1944
Fungi of North America